Rouhollah Ataei (born September 11, 1983 Iran – Qazvin) is an Iranian footballer. He plays for Paykan in the IPL.

Club career
Ataei has been with Paykan since 2009.

Club Career Statistics
Last Update  29 August 2010 

 Assist Goals

References

1983 births
Living people
Shirin Faraz Kermanshah players
Paykan F.C. players
Tractor S.C. players
Sanat Mes Kerman F.C. players
Iranian footballers
Association football forwards
People from Qazvin
21st-century Iranian people